The Royal Oude Harmonie, often appointed by their abbreviation KOH or the Limburgish term De Blôw, is a music association with a concert band and percussion ensemble from Eijsden, which was founded in 1874.

In 1949 the Oude Harmonie was the first association in Eijsden to receive the designation "Royal" or "Koninklijk" in Dutch.

In 1963, the Royal Oude Harmonie, under the direction of the then conductor Matthijs Scheffer, was promoted to the highest level: the Superior Division of the Limburgse bond van harmoniegezelschappen (Limburgish Association of Harmony Societies) in the Federatie van Katholieke Muziekbonden in Nederland (Federation of Catholic Music Associations in the Netherlands). New highlights were the musical performances delivered in 1988/1989 under the direction of conductor Jean Steutelings.

In 1993, the Royal Oude Harmonie, conducted by Ben Essers, took part in the World Music Contest (WMC) in Kerkrade and delivered a huge performance. In 1997 this result was surpassed. In 2013, the KOH took part in the WMC again, where a top score of 95.75 was achieved in the First Division Wind Band. With this point total, the KOH is the reigning Dutch champion in his division and vice world champion.

Concert band

Conductors

Percussion ensemble

Musical leaders

Trivia
In Eijsden the harmony is also known as "De Blôw", because of the blue color of the caps. This distinction is necessary in Eijsden, because there is another concert band in Eijsden, namely the Royal Harmonie Sainte Cécile Eijsden, which are called "De Roei", because of the red color of their caps.

Notes

External links 
 

Dutch orchestras
Concert bands
Musical groups from Limburg (Netherlands)
Musical groups established in 1874
1874 establishments in the Netherlands
Clubs and societies in the Netherlands
Eijsden-Margraten